Adrien Fourmaux (born 3 May 1995) is a French rally driver. Currently, He drives for M-Sport Ford in the WRC-RC1 category.

Rally career
After winning the Junior category of the 2018 French Rally Championship, Adrien Fourmaux made his WRC debut at the 2019 Monte Carlo Rally, and surprisingly took his first career point in a Ford Fiesta R5.

Throughout the 2019 season, he received full backing from the FFSA, running with a Ford Fiesta R5 under their supervision. He would finish on the podium of the World Rally Championship-2 category at the Monte Carlo Rally and the Wales Rally GB.

In 2020, He was signed by M-Sport Ford WRT to compete in the WRC-2.

Rally results

WRC results

WRC-2 results

ERC results

References

External links

Adrien Fourmaux's e-wrc profile

1995 births
Living people
French rally drivers
World Rally Championship drivers
M-Sport drivers